Kalbari is a village in Burigoalini Union, Shyamnagar Upazila, Satkhira District, Bangladesh. It is known for having a sand-filter well that purifies water drawn from the muddy fishponds, the only source for drinking water in the area.

References

Populated places in Khulna Division